Barbora Procházková (born 13 December 1991) is a Czech sprinter. She represented her country at two European Athletics Indoor Championships reaching the semifinals on the first occasion.

International competitions

Personal bests

Outdoor
100 metres – 11.50 (+1.8 m/s, Ustí Nad Orlicí 2016)
200 metres – 23.37 (-0.5 m/s, Budapest 2017)
Indoor
60 metres – 7.29 (Prague 2017)
200 metres – 23.89 (Prague 2013)

References

1991 births
Living people
Czech female sprinters
Competitors at the 2015 Summer Universiade
Competitors at the 2017 Summer Universiade
Charles University alumni